Operation Bull Run was a 48-hour-long military operation during the occupation of Iraq that began on 24 June 2007 in Al Dura'iya. A joint operation between the US Army's 1st Battalion, 15th Infantry of the 3rd Heavy Brigade and the Iraqi National Police and Iraqi Army, the operation netted four to seven captured insurgents and two killed. Launched from Forward Operating Base Hammer, it formed part of Operation Marne Torch, clearing insurgent sanctuaries to the southeast of Baghdad, and in addition to the insurgents killed and captured, it liberated three separate caches of artillery rounds, mortars, firearms and ammunition, along with propaganda and cell phones.

On 27 June 2007, following the conclusion of the operation the previous day, the Official News Website for Operation Iraqi Freedom released a news bulletin on Operation Bull Run.

Notes

External links
 Operation Bull Run disrupts insurgent operations press release by Operation Iraqi Freedom Official News Site.
 Operation Bull Run from Global Security

Military operations of the Iraq War in 2007
Military operations of the Iraq War involving the United States
Military operations of the Iraq War involving Iraq
Iraqi insurgency (2003–2011)